Ana Knežević (born 18 December 2002) is a Montenegrin footballer who plays as a forward for Montenegrin Women's League club ŽFK Breznica and the Montenegro women's national team.

Club career
Knežević has played for Breznica in Montenegro.

International career
Knežević made her senior debut for Montenegro on 12 June 2019 as a 78th-minute substitution in a 0–0 friendly away draw against Bosnia and Herzegovina.

References

2002 births
Living people
Montenegrin women's footballers
Women's association football forwards
ŽFK Breznica players
Montenegro women's international footballers